Events during the year 1996 in Northern Ireland.

Incumbents
 Secretary of State - Patrick Mayhew

Events
24 January - The international body proposes six principles of democracy and non-violence ('the Mitchell principles') as conditions for entry to all-party talks in Northern Ireland.
9 February - A large Provisional Irish Republican Army bomb explodes in the London Docklands area, near Canary Wharf, injuring around forty, and marking the end of a 17-month IRA  ceasefire.
17 March - a three year old is killed by the RUC in Dungannon.

31 March - Crumlin Road (HM Prison) in Belfast is closed.
c. April - Northern Ireland Women's Coalition formed.
30 May - Elections to the Northern Ireland Forum.
7–11 July - Drumcree conflict: A standoff over the annual Orange Order parade at Drumcree leads to rioting here and elsewhere in Northern Ireland. There are two related deaths and around 150 injuries.
1 October - Radio station Belfast CityBeat begins broadcasting.
7 October - Thiepval barracks bombing: The IRA explodes two car bombs inside the British Army headquarters at Lisburn, killing one soldier and injuring 37 other people.

Arts and literature
August - Marie Jones' play Stones in His Pockets premieres in Belfast.
The Hole in the Wall Gang win a Royal Television Society Award for Best Regional Programme for the comedy Two Ceasefires and a Wedding, the 1995 pilot for Give My Head Peace.
Seamus Deane publishes his novel Reading in the Dark.
Seamus Heaney publishes his poetry collection The Spirit Level which wins the poetry section of the 1996 Whitbread Awards.
Deirdre Madden publishes her novel One by One in the Darkness which is shortlisted for the 1997 Orange Prize for Fiction.
Robert McLiam Wilson publishes his novel Eureka Street.

Sport

Football
Irish League
Winners: Portadown

Irish Cup
Winners: Glentoran 1 - 0 Glenavon

Motorcycling
20 April - Robert Dunlop, after an accident in 1994, returns to race in the Cookstown 100, taking ninth place in the 125cc race won by brother, Joey Dunlop.

Births

Deaths
12 February - Bob Shaw, science fiction novelist (born 1931).
6 August - Havelock Nelson, composer and pianist (born 1917).
1 October - Pat McGeown, volunteer in the Provisional Irish Republican Army, took part in the 1981 Irish hunger strike (born 1956).
4 October - Humphrey Atkins, fifth Secretary of State for Northern Ireland.
17 December - Ruby Murray, singer (born 1935).

Full date unknown
Arthur Armstrong, painter (born 1924).

See also
1996 in England
1996 in Scotland
1996 in Wales

References

 
Northern Ireland